God's Money is a 1959 Argentine film directed by Román Viñoly Barreto.  It stars Carlos Estrada and Fina Basser.

Plot 
A man is led to commit a robbery by the woman he falls in love with later when he is released from the prison he takes refuge in a convent.

Cast
  Francisco Petrone …Francisco Alaria
  Fina Basser …María de Lourdes
  Mario Lozano …Inspector Campos
  Carlos Estrada …Ramiro
  Carlos López Monet …Torito
  Jorge Sobral …Fray Mario
  Mariano Monclús …Fray Hernando
  José Maurer …Hombre en monasterio
  Enzo Bai …Sacerdote
  Pedro Venturini
  Paquita Vehil …Manicura
  Utimio Bertozzi
  Maruja Lopetegui …Madre de Francisco

External links
 

1959 films
1950s Spanish-language films
Films directed by Román Viñoly Barreto
Argentine black-and-white films
1950s Argentine films